I'm Still Standing is the autobiography of Fabrice Muamba, released on 4 November 2012 by Trinity Mirror Sport Media, .

About

Muamba wrote the autobiography in five weeks with Chris Brereton. The book is about Muamba's collapse in March 2012 in an FA Cup quarter final between Bolton Wanderers and Tottenham Hotspur. It is also about his early life in the Congo.

References

Sports autobiographies
2012 non-fiction books
Association football books